Peter Garden (reputedly c. 1644 – 12 January 1775) lived in the parish of Auchterless, Aberdeen Shire. At least two portraits of him exist. One is in the collection of the British Museum and another in the Wellcome Collection. Both portraits claim that he lived for 131 years. The Wellcome Collection portrait also says Garden was "famous for uninterrupted health, gigantic stature."

References 

1640s births
1775 deaths